Allison Margaret Kirkman is a New Zealand sociology academic with interests in 'death and dying; gender, sexuality, ageing and health; health care work and workers.' In 2014 she was appointed the Vice Provost (Academic and Equity) at Victoria University of Wellington before moving to become Pro-Vice Chancellor for the Division of Arts, Law, Psychology and Social Sciences at the University of Waikato. She was made an Emeritus Professor at the University of Waikato in 2022 in recognition of her work to set up a nursing programme at the university.

Kirkman's 1996 PhD thesis was on Ways of Being Religious: Lesbians and Christianity.

Selected publications
 Allison Kirkman. Health practitioners, Te Ara: The Encyclopedia of New Zealand, updated 9 November 2012
 Allison Kirkman and Pat Moloney eds. Sexuality Down Under Social and Historical Perspectives Otago University Press 2006 
 Kevin Dew and Allison Kirkman Sociology of health in New Zealand Oxford University Press 2002. .

References

New Zealand sociologists
Living people
Victoria University of Wellington alumni
Academic staff of the Victoria University of Wellington
Academic staff of the University of Waikato
Year of birth missing (living people)
Place of birth missing (living people)